The association AIBR (Network of Iberoamerican Anthropologists, from the Spanish Antropólogos Iberoamericanos en Red) started in 1996 with the creation of the portal El Rincón del Antropólogo (The Anthropologist Corner), that brought together the team of one of the first portals of anthropology in the Spanish-speaking world. The association has become a network that connects more than 7,000 anthropologist of Spain, Portugal and all the Latin American countries.

Creation of AIBR and AIBR. Revista de Antropología Iberoamericana
In November 2002 the association was legally constituted and recognized by the Minister of the Interior of Spain. 
Since 2001, AIBR publishes the scientific journal AIBR. Revista de Antropología Iberoamericana ('Journal of Iberoamerican Anthropology') every four months electronically and in paper.

Objectives of AIBR

The basic objectives of AIBR are:

To promote the different activities related to anthropology, as well as to spread the themes related to the fields of anthropology.
To promote and support the exchange of ideas and opportunities among the well-known professionals of this discipline or those who are interested in Anthropology.
To develop communication between related institutions, both Spanish and foreign.
In general, all the activities related to the development and promotion of topics related to Anthropology.

AIBR Annual International Conference of Anthropology
On July 7–10, 2015 the association held in Madrid (Spain) its first international conference under the global theme "The human being: cultures, origins, and destiny", with over 800 delegates. The meeting was presented by anthropologist Didier Fassin (Institute for Advanced Study in Princeton), and closed with a lecture by Aurora González Echevarria (Autonomous University of Barcelona).

The Second AIBR International Conference took place in Barcelona (http://2016.aibr.org) in September 2016, under the global theme the "Identity: Bridges, Thresholds, and Barriers".. This edition opened with a plenary conference by Arturo Escobar (University of North Carolina at Chapel Hill), and continued with further lectures by Tim Ingold (University of Aberdeen), Verena Stolcke (Autonomous University of Barcelona) and Manuel Delgado (University of Barcelona).

The Third AIBR International Conference of Anthropology took place in Puerto Vallarta, Mexico (http://2017.aibr.org) in November 2017, and was the first edition of the AIBR Conference to take place across the Atlantic. The global theme was "Travels, crossings, displacements", and began with an inaugural lecture by Marc Augé (École des Hautes Études en Sciences Sociales, EHESS).

The Fourth AIBR International Conference of Anthropology took place in Granada (http://2018.aibr.org), under the general theme "Dialogues, Encounters and Stories from the Souths". This edition began with a plenary session by Nigel Barley and closed with a closing plenary session by Paul Stoller (West Chester University, Pennsylvania) and Maria Paula Meneses (CES Coimbra) offered a conference. Besides, a new form of meeting was introduced, with the first "Diálogo a Dos" between María Teresa del Valle (University of Basque Country) and Mónica Tarducci (University of Buenos Aires) on the connections between anthropology and feminism.

List of plenary speakers who have participated in both the opening and closing sessions and who endorse for their contribution to the discipline in the international arena

AIBR Best Article Award in Iberoamerican Anthropology

Since 2013, the AIBR Best Article Award in Iberoamerican Anthropology is awarded annually to the best article from the previous calendar year.  This award is sponsored by the AIBR journal and comes with a prize of EUR 400. The articles shortlisted for the Award are the ones finally published in the scientific journal AIBR.

More information

AIBR does not belong to any university or academic institution, neither does it follow any political or religious faith. It is a private, independent initiative that anyone may join. It is funded by means of the statutory projects and activities, and the annual subscription fees provided by its members. AIBR has belonged to the International Union of Anthropological and Ethnological Sciences (IUAES) since July 2005.

References

External links
Official website

Anthropology-related professional associations